David Lance Tipton (born April 23, 1949 in Hollister, California) is a former professional American football player who played in six NFL seasons from 1971 to 1976 for the New York Giants, the San Diego Chargers and the Seattle Seahawks.

Tipton played college football at Stanford University, where he was a member of the Thunderchickens defense line that helped Stanford to a Rose Bowl victory in 1971. After retiring from football, Tipton was an assistant football coach at Stanford from 1992 to 2006. Tipton now teaches history at St. Mary's High School in Stockton, California and is the Defensive Line Coach for the varsity football team. 
In 2008 his team earned the honor of playing in their State Division finals, and national television declared the team amazing in its progress and development within the two-year period of Dave's coaching influences.

College coaching career
1984–1987: California State Fullerton (DL/ST)
1988: Oregon State University (DL)
1989–1991: Stanford University (LB)
1992–2006: Stanford University (DL)

References

1949 births
Living people
People from Hollister, California
Players of American football from California
American football defensive ends
American football defensive tackles
Stanford Cardinal football players
New York Giants players
San Diego Chargers players
Seattle Seahawks players
Stanford Cardinal football coaches